Quaker Meadows Cemetery is a historic cemetery located near Morganton, North Carolina.  It includes 59 gravesites dated between 1767 and 1879; 53 of them are marked by gravestones.  The earliest grave is of David McDowell (1767), the two-year-old grandson of Joseph McDowell, the first permanent white settler in the area.

It was listed on the National Register of Historic Places in 1987.

References

External links
 

Cemeteries on the National Register of Historic Places in North Carolina
1767 establishments in North Carolina
National Register of Historic Places in Burke County, North Carolina